Pennsylvania Route 388 (PA 388) is a north–south state highway in Lawrence County, Pennsylvania, United States, located in Western Pennsylvania.  It travels  between PA 168 in East Brook and PA 65 in Energy.

Route description

PA 388 begins at an intersection with PA 65 in the community of Energy in Shenango Township, heading north on a two-lane undivided road. The route passes through rural areas of homes, crossing into Slippery Rock Township. The road continues past areas of farms and woods with some rural residences, becoming the border between Shenango Township to the west and Slippery Rock Township to the east. PA 388 bends slightly to the east to fully enter Slippery Rock Township, crossing into Shenango Township again as it comes to an intersection with US 422. After this junction, the route passes through rural residential areas in the community of Wiegletown, becoming the border of Shenango Township and Slippery Rock Township again. The road passes through more areas of farmland and woodland with a few homes, bending west into Shenango Township prior to entering Hickory Township. In this area, PA 388 comes to a junction with PA 108. The route continues through more rural areas before coming to its northern terminus at PA 168.

Major intersections

See also

References

External links

Pennsylvania Highways: PA 388

388
Transportation in Lawrence County, Pennsylvania